Tomasino is a surname. Notable people with the surname include:

Carbilio Tomasino, Salvadoran football coach
 Jeana Tomasino (born 1955), American television personality
Philip Tomasino (born 2001), Canadian professional ice hockey forward
Ricardo Tomasino, Salvadoran football coach

Italian-language surnames
Patronymic surnames
Surnames from given names